Peter Zeiler (born 8 October 1970) is a German former footballer. He spent 2 seasons in the Bundesliga with SpVgg Unterhaching.

References

1970 births
Living people
German footballers
TSV 1860 Munich players
SpVgg Unterhaching players
Bundesliga players

Association football midfielders
FC Amberg players